Kepler-296 is a binary star system in the constellation Draco. The primary star appears to be a late K-type main-sequence star, while the secondary is a red dwarf.

Planetary system

Five exoplanets have been detected around the system; all are believed to be orbiting the primary star rather than its dimmer companion. Two planets in particular, Kepler-296e and Kepler-296f, are likely located in the habitable zone. For the planetary system to remain stable, no additional giant planets can be located up to orbital radius 10.1 AU.

See also 
 Habitability of red dwarf systems
 List of potentially habitable exoplanets

References

External links 
 Kepler-296 - Open Exoplanet Catalogue

 
Draco (constellation)
M-type main-sequence stars
Binary stars
J19060960+4926143
Planetary systems with five confirmed planets
K-type main-sequence stars